Mike Redshaw is a former South African international lawn and indoor bowler.

Redshaw won a bronze medal in the fours at the 1998 Commonwealth Games in Kuala Lumpur with Neil Burkett, Bruce Makkink and Robert Rayfield.

References

Living people
South African male bowls players
Bowls players at the 1998 Commonwealth Games
Commonwealth Games bronze medallists for South Africa
Commonwealth Games medallists in lawn bowls
Year of birth missing (living people)
Medallists at the 1998 Commonwealth Games